Charles David Clough (born 4 September 1990) is an English professional footballer who plays as a defender for Nakhon Ratchasima.

Career

Bristol Rovers
Originally from Taunton in Somerset, Clough was admitted into the Bristol Rovers youth set-up, based at the Bristol Academy of Sport, and was promoted to the first-team squad in the summer of 2007. His Football League debut, aged 17, came in a League One match against Brighton & Hove Albion at the Memorial Stadium on 26 April 2008 as a substitute in the 68th minute.

At the start of the 2008–09 season he was sent to Mangotsfield United on a month's loan to gain some first team experience, with the loan later extended into a second month. In September 2010, he joined Newport County on a one-month loan. In January 2011, he joined struggling Southern Premier League club Weymouth on a month-long loan.

On 28 February 2011, he joined Bath City on an initial loan period of a month. He made his debut for Bath City on 1 March 2011 in a 5–1 away defeat against Rushden & Diamonds. He was recalled from his loan period on 28 April 2011 having scored two goals in eleven appearances. He re-joined Bath on loan later that year, when they signed him in a month-long emergency deal. In March 2012, he joined A.F.C. Telford United on loan.

In December 2011, he was told he would be allowed to leave Bristol Rovers alongside teammate Ben Swallow.

Dorchester Town
In the summer of 2012, Clough joined Dorchester Town, signing a permanent deal. On 4 November 2012, he was a part of the Dorchester side that earned a shock 1–0 win over Plymouth Argyle in the FA Cup first round.

In April 2013, he was named the Dorset Echo Player of the Year at the club. In September 2013, Dorchester 'reluctantly' agreed to a request from Clough to have him put on the transfer list.

Sutton United
On 12 September 2013, he moved to Conference South league rivals Sutton United who paid an undisclosed fee for his signature. He scored on 9 November 2013 in a 4–1 away defeat against Conference National Kidderminster Harriers in the first round of the FA Cup.

He was made captain at Sutton United amid interest from clubs at a higher level. During the 2013–14 season, he helped the club to the Conference South play-off semi-finals where they lost against Dover Athletic who would go on to win promotion to the Conference National.

Forest Green Rovers
On 4 January 2015, it was confirmed he would be joining Conference National club Forest Green Rovers for an undisclosed fee. He made his Forest Green debut on 17 January 2015, playing the full 90 minutes in a 2–1 away win against Braintree Town. He scored his first goal for the club on 21 February 2015 in a 3–0 home win over former club AFC Telford United. He helped Forest Green into the 2014–15 Conference National play-offs for the first time, playing in both legs of a semi-final defeat against former club Bristol Rovers.

He scored his first goal of the 2015–16 season in stoppage time to earn Forest Green a 2–1 win over Macclesfield Town on 30 January 2016. Later that season, he helped the club reach the 2015-16 National League play-off final at Wembley Stadium, and played the full 90 minutes in a game that ended in a 3–1 defeat to Grimsby Town. It was confirmed the next day that he had agreed a contract extension to stay at the club.

In November 2016, he signed a new contract with Forest Green, agreeing a deal until the summer of 2019.

Barnet
On 23 January 2017, Clough signed for Barnet for an undisclosed fee. He was released by Barnet at the end of the 2017–18 season.

Return to Sutton
Clough re-joined Sutton for the 2018–19 season.

DPMM
Clough left Sutton in December 2018 and joined Bruneian club DPMM for the 2019 season, joining up with his former manager at Forest Green, Adrian Pennock. He scored his first goal for the Bruneian side in a 1–1 draw away to Young Lions FC on 7 August. DPMM were crowned champions of the Singapore Premier League on his first season at the club. Clough played a huge part in the title-winning campaign, his club claiming the joint-best defensive record of the league after 24 matches.

On 9 November 2020, Clough announced on his social media accounts that he has signed for a third year with DPMM FC. With his team playing domestically for the 2021 season, he made his debut against BAKES FC on 27 June, scoring five goals in a 16-1 rout. Clough left DPMM at the year's end.

Nakhon Ratchasima

On 9 December 2021, Clough joined Thai League 1 side Nakhon Ratchasima. On 16 April 2022, he scored his first league goal in a 1–0 win over Ratchaburi FC.

Career statistics

Honours
Brunei DPMM FC
Singapore Premier League: 2019

References

External links
Charlie Clough player profile at bristolrovers.co.uk

1990 births
Living people
Sportspeople from Taunton
English footballers
Association football defenders
Bristol Rovers F.C. players
Mangotsfield United F.C. players
Chippenham Town F.C. players
Newport County A.F.C. players
Weymouth F.C. players
Bath City F.C. players
AFC Telford United players
Dorchester Town F.C. players
Sutton United F.C. players
Forest Green Rovers F.C. players
Barnet F.C. players
DPMM FC players
English Football League players
National League (English football) players
Southern Football League players
Singapore Premier League players
Charlie Clough
Charlie Clough
English expatriate footballers
Expatriate footballers in Brunei
English expatriate sportspeople in Thailand
English expatriate sportspeople in Brunei